Fochabers Town railway station served the village of Fochabers, Moray, Scotland from 1893 to 1966 on the Inverness and Aberdeen Junction Railway.

History 
The station opened as Fochabers on 23 October 1893 by the Highland Railway. It was situated as a terminus of a branch line from Orbliston Junction The name was changed to Fochabers Town on 1 July 1894. The station closed to passengers on 14 September 1931 and to goods traffic on 28 March 1966.

References

External links 

Disused railway stations in Moray
Former Highland Railway stations
Railway stations in Great Britain opened in 1893
Railway stations in Great Britain closed in 1931
1893 establishments in Scotland